Julie Nauche  born 4 June 1988 in La Réunion (France) is the Regional Director of Miss Earth Reunion and Miss Earth Mauritius. To complete the organisation of these two contests, she create the Miss Earth Océan Indien Organisation.

Julie Nauche is the owner of Perfect Communication company.

She was also in charge of the organisation of Princesse Réunion, a pageant for little girls aged from 7 to 11 years. The winner represented Reunion Island to the national pageant Mini-Miss France.
Due to the ban on pageants for children under the age of 16 in France, Princesse Réunion doesn't exist anymore.

Pageantry
Julie Nauche was the first ever Miss Supranational Reunion Island and represented the island at Miss Supranational 2013 pageant.

References

1988 births
Living people
French female models
Beauty pageant winners from Réunion